Justin Adam Maxwell (born November 6, 1983) is an American former professional baseball outfielder. He played in Major League Baseball (MLB) for the Washington Nationals, Houston Astros, Kansas City Royals, and San Francisco Giants .

Biography

Early life
Maxwell is the son of Austin Maxwell, a US Navy dentist who also served as the "presidential dentist" from 1997 to 2002, providing dental care for US Presidents Bill Clinton and George W. Bush, and Vice President Al Gore, and their families. His mother, Kathy, was also a Navy officer. He has one sister. He grew up in Maryland and South Carolina, and lived in Japan for four years while his father was stationed there.

Maxwell was drafted out of Sherwood High School by the Baltimore Orioles in the 43rd round (1279th overall) of the 2001 Major League Baseball Draft, but opted instead to attend college at the University of Maryland. In 2003, he played collegiate summer baseball with the Bourne Braves of the Cape Cod Baseball League, was named a league all-star, and returned to the league in 2004 to play for the Cotuit Kettleers.

Professional career

Washington Nationals
In , he split his time between Low-A Hagerstown, and High-A Potomac, where, he combined to hit .281 with 27 home runs, 83 RBI and 35 stolen bases, the only player in Minor League Baseball to record at least 25 doubles, 25 home runs and 25 stolen bases in 2007."

After the minor league season ended, the Nationals promoted Maxwell to the major leagues, though he "was told not to expect much from his first month in the majors." On September 5, he made his debut, as a pinch hitter, and flied out to the warning track. Six days later, in his third pinch hitting appearance, Maxwell recorded his first career base hit, a pinch-hit grand slam off an 0–2 pitch from Chris Seddon, of the Florida Marlins. After the 2007 regular season, Maxwell played for the Peoria Javelinas in the Arizona Fall League.

Maxwell was assigned to the Harrisburg Senators of the Double-A Eastern League in 2008 after hitting .280 in 13 spring training games for Washington, but missed most of the year with a fractured wrist suffered while diving for a flyball in the outfield.

Maxwell spent most of the 2009 season with the AAA Syracuse Chiefs of the International League.  He was called up late in the season because of injured center fielder Nyjer Morgan. On September 30, Maxwell hit a two-out full count walk off grand slam off of Francisco Rodriguez of the New York Mets on Fan Appreciation Day, the Nationals' last home game of the season.

Maxwell split time with the AAA Syracuse Chiefs of the International League and the Nationals in 2010. On September 15, Maxwell hit a grand slam in the 2nd inning off of Mike Minor of the Atlanta Braves giving him three grand slams in four career at bats with the bases loaded. In September, Maxwell sat out two games with a minor thumb injury suffered on September 18. He returned September 21 against the Houston Astros. Maxwell underwent Tommy John surgery after the season.

New York Yankees
On February 2, 2011 the Nationals traded Maxwell to the New York Yankees for minor league pitcher Adam Olbrychowski. Maxwell began the 2011 season with the Triple-A Scranton/Wilkes-Barre Yankees, but his season ended prematurely due to a torn labrum.  The Yankees designated Maxwell for assignment at the end of spring training in 2012.

Houston Astros

The Houston Astros claimed Maxwell off waivers on April 8. Maxwell led the team in home runs with 18. He batted .229 and had 53 RBIs.

Kansas City Royals
Maxwell was traded to the Kansas City Royals for Kyle Smith on July 31, 2013. He hit a walk-off grand slam on September 22, 2013 against the Texas Rangers. He was designated for assignment on May 16, 2014. After being re-added to the roster, he was designated for assignment again on June 30, 2014. Maxwell elected free agency in October 2014.

San Francisco Giants
Entering the 2015 spring training as a non-roster hopeful for the San Francisco Giants, Maxwell hit for power and a .300+ batting average, which earned him a contract for the 2015 season. He was designated for assignment on September 1, 2015.

Miami Marlins
On November 30, 2015, Maxwell signed a minor league deal with the Miami Marlins. He was released on March 29, 2016.

Boston Red Sox
On April 1, 2016, Maxwell signed a minor league deal with the Boston Red Sox.

Lotte Giants
On July 6, 2016, Maxwell signed with Lotte Giants of the Korea Baseball Organization for the rest of 2016 season.

Broadcaster
From August 31 to September 3, 2019, Maxwell made his debut as a broadcaster, serving as a substitute studio analyst on the Nats Xtra shows that aired before and after Washington Nationals games on the Mid-Atlantic Sports Network. He has served as a substitute for regular analyst F.P. Santangelo on the MASN broadcast of Nationals games during the 2021 season.

Personal
Maxwell is married and has three children.

Maxwell is also currently attending University of Maryland Baltimore, School of Dentistry in the class of 2022.

See also
 Houston Astros award winners and league leaders

References

External links

1983 births
Living people
Washington Nationals players
Houston Astros players
Kansas City Royals players
San Francisco Giants players
Maryland Terrapins baseball players
Vermont Lake Monsters players
Savannah Sand Gnats players
Hagerstown Suns players
Potomac Nationals players
Harrisburg Senators players
Syracuse Chiefs players
Scranton/Wilkes-Barre Yankees players
Oklahoma City RedHawks players
Corpus Christi Hooks players
Omaha Storm Chasers players
Criollos de Caguas players
African-American baseball players
Baseball players from Maryland
Major League Baseball outfielders
People from Olney, Maryland
Peoria Javelinas players
Lotte Giants players
American expatriate baseball players in South Korea
Bourne Braves players
Cotuit Kettleers players
Liga de Béisbol Profesional Roberto Clemente outfielders
21st-century African-American sportspeople
20th-century African-American people